South Grafton High School (abbreviated as SGHS) is a government-funded co-educational comprehensive secondary day school, located in , in the Mid North Coast region of New South Wales, Australia. 

In 2018, the school enrolled approximately 520 students from Year 7 to Year 12, of whom 21 percent identified as Indigenous Australians and three percent were from a language background other than English. The school is operated by the NSW Department of Education.

See also

 List of government schools in New South Wales
 List of schools in Northern Rivers and Mid North Coast
 Education in Australia
 Grafton High School

References

Public high schools in New South Wales
South High School